Philippine New Wave (known as Filipino New Wave or Contemporary Philippine Cinema) is a filmmaking genre that has been popularly associated with the resurgence of independent, digital and experimental films in the Philippines began in the 21st century, merged into a recent filmmaking period known as the Third Golden Age of Philippine cinema.

Origins of the movement 
Following the first golden age, in the 1950s to 1960s, and the second, from the 1970s to the early 1980s, the dawn of this era saw a dramatic decline of the mainstream film industry in the Philippines in mid-1980s to 1990s. Hollywood films dominated theater sales even more, and fewer than twenty local studio films were being produced and shown yearly. Many producers and production houses later stopped producing films after losing millions of pesos.

Thereafter, a new sense of excitement and trend enveloped the industry with the coming of digital and experimental cinema. Seemingly signaling this was the winning of the Palme d'Or at the Cannes Film Festival 2000 of Raymond Red's short film Anino (Shadows). But truly pioneering this digital revolution was the 1999 digital feature film Still Lives by Jon Red. Many other digital filmmakers soon followed suit. Cheaper production cost using digital media over film has helped the rebirth of independent filmmaking. Hailed as the inspiration to French New Wave in digital form, this decade saw the proliferation of digital films by independent filmmakers with international reach and caliber, and the introduction of locally produced animated features. Production of action films is on a decline, and formulaic romantic comedies and melodrama films constituted the majority of mainstream releases. However, independent filmmakers spurred a renewed interest in Filipino movies through digital movies.

History 
It was in 1999 that digital cinema was introduced in the Philippines but by then, the film industry was already dwindling in numbers. According to the records of the UP Film Institute, 122 films were produced in the year 1999 and 83 in 2000. In 2002, the number went even lower with having only 92 films then further went down to 80 in 2003. This decline in film production was attributed to the country's economic movement wherein the Philippine Film industry was considered one of the heavily taxed industries in terms of equipment, materials and film stock and the imposition of a 30 percent amusement tax to be paid to the local government and a 12 percent value added tax to the central government. Consequently, the high production costs brought about by the high taxes caused ticket admission to also go up. Thus leading to people opting for a different and cheaper form of entertainment particularly in television.

Signs of rebirth of the Philippine cinema arose by way of movies with inspirational themes. In 2002, Gil Portes released Mga Munting Tinig (Small Voices), a subdued movie about a teacher who inspired her students to follow their dreams; the movie also implied improving the country's education system. A year later, Mark Meily's comedy Crying Ladies, about three Filipinas working as professional mourners in Manila's Chinatown but looking for other ways to earn a living, became a huge hit. Also that same year, Maryo J. de los Reyes made a buzz at various film festivals with Magnifico, a simple film with universal appeal about a boy trying to help his family survive their hardships.

In 2005, the film industry saw the lowest number of films produced with only 50 films that were commercially released. However, the establishment of film festivals Cinemalaya and Cinema One Originals which are dedicated to digital films, the addition of Digital Lokal, a digital section, at the Cinemanila International Film Festival, and the second offering of the .MOV International Digital Film Festival helped save the Philippine Film industry.

In 2006 and 2007, Filipino filmmakers started making movies using digital media. Duda (Doubt) is an example of how a man driven by an idea for a film, against all odds, can succeed in creating a significant statement. Writer/Director Crisaldo Pablo used a cast of friends and some professional actors, and with the use of a Sony VX-1, a Hi-8 camcorder, made the first full-length digital movie ever shot in the Philippines. Comments by Cris Pablo and casts in the 'making of' featurette on the DVD demonstrated how much dedication to vision played in this movie. Donsol, by director Adolfo Alix, made waves with his debut digital movie about Donsol, a fishing town and in the opposite, a sanctuary to endangered whale sharks. Other filmmakers of note include Jeffrey Jeturian and Auraeus Solito. 

Although Filipino digital films are made in almost no time and with meager budget, they are strongly represented in international film festivals. Numerous works of a new breed of filmmakers had their films seen at the prestigious film festivals around the world like in Berlin, Cannes, Venice, Vienna and Rotterdam. with several winning prizes and awards. Among the works included are Ang Pagdadalaga ni Maximo Oliveros (2005) by Auraeus Solito, Kubrador (2006) by Jeffrey Jeturian, Todo Todo Teros (2006) by John Torres, Endo (2007) by Jade Castro, Tribu (2007) by Jim Libiran.

In 2007, a Filipino short film entitled Napapanggap (Pretend) by Debbie Formoso, a recent graduate of MFA Master of Film Art at LMU Loyola Marymount University in Los Angeles, had a successful run in a number of US film festivals. Several other short films, including Pedro "Joaquin" Valdes's Bulong (Whisper), as well as documentaries, garnered international attention and honors.

The same year, the first full-length animated Filipino film, Urduja, topbilled by Cesar Montano and Regine Velasquez as voices behind the lead characters, premiered in local theaters. The film was done by over 400 Filipino animators, who produced more than 120,000 drawings that ran in 1,922 scenes equivalent to 8,771 feet of film. Later in the year, the Philippine movie industry took centerstage at the 6th Edition of the Festival Paris Cinema 2008 in France. About 40 Filipino films were shown at the film festival, with Star Cinema's Caregiver (starring Sharon Cuneta) and Ploning (Judy Ann Santos) as opening films. Filipino actor Piolo Pascual was invited by Paris Mayor Delanoe and actress Charlotte Rampling to grace the occasion. Before the closing of 2008, another full-length animated film, Dayo: Sa Mundo ng Elementalia, graced the bigscreen as an entry to the 2008 Metro Manila Film Festival.

In order to build up and stimulate the film industry, some Congressmen and Senators recently have authored a number of proposals and legislations pending ratification by the Philippine Congress. Many of the bills seek to ease the multiple taxes on producers, theater operators and patrons. One of the bills, for instance, proposes to exempt from the 30-percent amusement tax on all locally produced movies classified by regulators as for "general patronage" or "parental guidance-13". Another bill seeks to exempt local producers from the 12-percent value-added tax (VAT) on imported filmmaking raw materials and equipment.

In 2010, an eponymous documentary film, Philippine New Wave: This Is Not a Film Movement, about the most prominent internationally-acclaimed and wildly divergent digital filmmakers from the Philippines answer questions on filmmaking and beyond.

Notable filmmakers

Lav Diaz 

Lav Diaz is a Filipino independent filmmaker and former film critics who have known as a leading figure in experimental Philippine films and is one of the most critically acclaimed contemporary Filipino filmmakers whose works include long epics about Filipino life, some of which run up to ten hours including the 2004 film Ebolusyon ng Isang Pamilyang Pilipino, often testing the endurance of viewers.

In 2014, Diaz directed his 12th narrative feature, Mula sa Kung Ano ang Noon (literally "From What is Before") won the Golden Leopard at the 2014 Locarno Film Festival. Its win was a highly regarded as the second Filipino film to be awarded at an international film festival in the world almost twenty years after Lamangan's The Flor Contemplacion Story won the Golden Pyramid at the 1995 Cairo International Film Festival.

In 2016, Diaz directed his 16th narrative feature, Hele sa Hiwagang Hapis, received mixed reviews and was selected to compete for the Golden Bear at the 66th Berlin International Film Festival, won the Alfred Bauer Prize.

At the same year, Diaz directed his 17th narrative feature, Ang Babaeng Humayo (literally "The Woman Who Left"), received the Golden Lion at the 73rd Venice International Film Festival, the first Philippine film to do so, although it could be eligible to be submitted as a Philippine entry for the Best Foreign Language Film award at the 89th Academy Awards before it ended up selected to Mendoza's competitive film Ma' Rosa.

In 2017, Diaz became one of the few Filipinos who have invited by the Academy of Motion Picture Arts and Sciences to join as a member.

Avid Liongoren 
 
Avid Liongoren is a Filipino filmmaker, animator, and illustrator for both animated and live-action productions, notably he founded his own production company Rocketsheep Studios. His works are developed mostly for television commercials and music videos in 2000s, and began to rose local popularity of his works developed only animated features aimed for adult audiences in the 2010s and 2020s.

In 2016, Liongoren's first feature film debut was live-action animated hybrid film Saving Sally, was first introduced in mid-2000s after the concept by Charlene Sawit in 2000, originally titled Monster Town as a short story. It began in early-2000s and took twelve years to develop the film before was released in Philippine cinemas on Christmas Day as an official submission at the 2016 Metro Manila Film Festival, which received both commercial success and positive reviews from critics in the Philippines.

In 2020, Liongoren's second film also became the first feature-length adult animated film ever developed in the Philippines, Hayop Ka!, concepted after Saving Sally and took three years to produce, describe it as "light and comical", aim for adults due to use of amount of profanity and sexual content like the previous film did. The film starring Angelica Panganiban, Robin Padilla, and Sam Milby. The film was distributed by Netflix to positive reviews and garnered seven nominations at the 44th Gawad Urian Awards including Best Film and Best Director, winning Best Animation, as well as six nominations at the 60th FAMAS Awards including Best Film and Best Director, winning Best Screenplay. It was nominated as an official selection for main competition at the 2021 Annecy International Animated Film Festival, became the first Filipino animated feature film to do so, although it lost to Academy Award-nominee Flee.

In 2021, it was announced two animated projects based on other works; Zsazsa Zaturnnah Vs The Amazonistas Of Planet X, an adult animated superhero film based on a komik "Zsazsa Zaturnnah" by Carlo Vergara, where did it posted at Facebook, after originally pitched as a television series nor another live-action film but agreed to produce as an animated film with Vergara as a screenplay. Light Lost, a fantasy adventure based on the graphic novel of the same name by Rob Cham.

At the same year, he announced after the first film success that the sequel titled Hayop Ka Din!, is now in the works with Empoy Marquez reprises his role as Jerry the Frog.

Brillante Mendoza 

Brillante Mendoza is a Filipino filmmaker who is one of the key members associated with the Filipino New Wave, among his works garnered more than 50 awards and 75 nominations at national award ceremonies and international film festivals. He began to work as a filmmaker in 2005 before the dissolution of Danish's controversial movement Dogme 95, which he used some concept from the movement for his first film, The Masseur, serves as an inspiration. He has directed sixteen films since 2005, also he credited some of his films as cinematographer and production designer under his alias "Dante". His first frequent collaboration with actor Coco Martin in seven films including Masahista, Summer Heat, Foster Child, Tirador, Serbis, Kinatay, and Captive.

In 2008, Serbis (literally Service) became the first Filipino full-length film to compete for Palme d'Or at the Cannes Film Festival since internationally acclaimed director Lino Brocka's Bayan Ko: Kapit sa Patalim (literally "This is My Country") in 1984.

In 2009, Kinatay (literally "Butchered" or "The Execution of P"), about murder and police brutality, brought the highest international esteem to a Filipino filmmaker when Brillante Mendoza was judged as the Best Director at the 62nd Cannes Film Festival, the first Filipino filmmaker to receive the honor. The film was notorious for being critically panned by Roger Ebert, an American famous film critic, who declared it the worst film ever to be shown at the Cannes Film Festival since Gallo's The Brown Bunny. His win was heralded by President Arroyo and his countrymen.

In 2017, Mendoza became one of the few Filipinos who have invited by the Academy of Motion Picture Arts and Sciences to join as a member.

In 2019, he directed a titular film, Mindanao, a war drama about a Muslim mother cares for her cancer-stricken daughter while she awaits her husband to come home who serves as a combat medic deployed in the southern Philippines. The film receives critical acclaim from local reviews and won multiple awards at national award ceremonies including 45th Metro Manila Film Festival, 22nd Gawad Pasado, 38th FAP Luna Awards, and 14th Gawad Genio Awards, all of which categories are Best Film and Best Director.

Isabel Sandoval 

Isabel Sandoval is a Filipina filmmaker who has been associated with the next wave of Philippine independent cinema of the 2020s. Sandoval is also the first trans woman of color to compete at the Venice Film Festival for her international debut film, Lingua Franca. She is also known for her films Señorita and Aparisyon. She is currently working on her next feature Tropical Gothic, based on the 1972 short story by Nick Joaquin.

In 2022, Sandoval became the first Asian trans woman who have invited by the Academy of Motion Picture Arts and Sciences to join as a member.

Other known filmmakers 
Kanakan Balintagos
Joyce Bernal
Jade Castro
Pepe Diokno
Jeffrey Jeturian
Khavn
Erik Matti
Cathy Garcia-Molina
Mikhail Red
Kidlat Tahimik
Jerrold Tarog

Notable films 
 Ebolusyon ng Isang Pamilyang Pilipino (2004)
 Serbis (2008)
 Urduja (2008)
 Ded na si Lolo (2009)
 Kinatay (2009)
 RPG Metanoia (2010)
 Ang Babae sa Septic Tank (2011)
 Thy Womb (2012)
 Ang Babaeng Humayo (2016)
 Birdshot (2016)
 Die Beautiful (2016)
 Ma' Rosa (2016)
 Saving Sally (2016)
 Bliss (2017)
 Hello, Love, Goodbye (2019)
 Hayop Ka! (2020)

See also 

 Cinema of the Philippines

References 

Cinema of the Philippines